Nesøya is an island in Nordland county, Norway. The  island is located on the border of the municipalities of Rødøy and Lurøylies to the west of the island Storselsøya. The Arctic Circle passes just south of the island. In 2016, there were 126 residents living on the island, which is only accessible by boat.

See also
List of islands of Norway

References

Islands of Nordland
Rødøy
Lurøy